The O'Farrell Charter Schools (nicknamed OCS), located in San Diego, South California is an educational complex chartered as four schools in one, located in the neighborhoods of Skyline and South Encanto. The school charters elementary, middle, high and independent/online, The school(s) serves grades K-12 in the K-12 American education system. The school opened its doors in the San Diego Unified School District in 1959 with its name chosen in 1957 as Mabel E. O'Farrell Junior High. It was voted to become a charter school in 1994. President Bill Clinton made a visit to San Diego in 1995 to sign the   "Goals 2000" education bill and to visit O'Farrell because it was a charter.  It was also mentioned in Hillary Clinton's book It Takes a Village.  It has a code of conduct of how to become a good citizen called The Falcon Way, of Focus, Attitude, Leadership, Citizenship, Organization, and Non-Violence, that is indoctrinated per student.  Instead of being called principal, faculty and students refer to the educational leader as the Chief Educational Officer (CEO).   The large conspicuous mural in front of the school on the side of the Theatre was a tribute to a faculty member by the nickname "Animal" who died.  The mural was painted by students.

For 2006-2007, the school academic progress place it with an Academic Performance Index of 710 base with 720 growth, where 800 is the California state goal.  The school boasted itself as being #1 in API compared to other surrounding schools in its November 2007 edition of its  newsletter.  For October 2005, the demographic makeup of the student body consisted of 36% Hispanic, 31% Black, 24% Filipino, 3%White.

Hillary Clinton also mentions the O'Farrell way extending beyond these rules that also includes the graduation requirement of time for community service.  However, the graduation requirement actually fits under The O'Farrell Standard which is just an award and recognition issued for those who have essentially accomplished (1) good academic performance, (2) portfolio compilation, (3) presentation of the portfolio, (4) 12 hours of community service equally distributed at home, work, school; (5) good citizenship The O'Farrell Way all of which were mentioned in the school's charter proposal.

Alma mater 
Hail O'Farrell this is our homeHearts be ever trueLoyalty and honor singThe gold and royal blueSoaring far above it allThis is our familyForever here, forever oneFalcons ever free

Family organization and designations

The school originally used a social structure called Educational Families.  The faculty of the family taught interdisciplinary subjects.  For example, one teacher taught history in combination of biology while another teacher taught Spanish in combination of dance.  The family structure was introduced in the 1990s and more connected to newer branded O'Farrell Community School than older O'Farrell Junior High School.

It was organized in such a way one set of families serve the 6th grade then another set of families serve both 7 and 8 grade students simultaneously, especially the main and usually class of the day is called homebase or homeroom. Associated close with the letters are a name of a broad theme for example: I for Inspirations; E for Exceeders; F for Fantastics; D for Discovery; A for Achievers.

In later years, the school designated its families as Family 1, Family 2, ..., Family 6 with newer names such as "Great Force" for Family 5 and "Horizon Explorers" for Family 6.

Schools within a school 
The name of The O'Farrell Charter School is now plural, because what dates back to just a junior high charter school is now multiple schools in one. The four O'Farrell Charter Schools are:

 The O'Farrell Elementary School (grades K-5)
 The O'Farrell [Charter] Middle School (grades 6-8)
 The O'Farrell Charter High School (grades 9-12)
 Ingenuity Charter School (independent study school)

Each school has a principal and vice principal and has a separate program, teachers, and bell schedules. In the late 2000's, a new school was added for independent, mostly online classes called Ingenuity Charter. In 2020, O'Farrell Charter High was ranked the #3 high school in San Diego by U.S. News & World Report.

Awards 
AVID National Demonstration School by AVID

National Excellence in Urban Education Award by the National Center for Urban School Transformation (NCUST)

Best High Schools in America by U.S. News & World Report, 2018, 2019, 2020.

Notable alumni
Rosalie Hamlin known for 1960 song, "Angel Baby"
Tom Waits claimed to have attended this school and remembered it as an all-black school in a 1973 interview.
Shirley Horton, California assemblywoman and former mayor of Chula Vista

References

External links
Photograph of the Mural (top left image)

Schools in San Diego
Charter K-12 schools in California
Educational institutions established in 1959
1959 establishments in California